Valerio or Valério is a male given name in several languages, derived from the Roman surname Valerius, which itself is derived from the Latin verb valere - "to be strong". Valerio also appears as a family name or surname. Valerio is a relatively common given name in Italy, while its incidence is less common in the Spanish and Croatian Sprachraum. The Portuguese form of the name is Valério. The form of Valerio is Valeriu in the Romanian language.

Valerio as a given name
 Valerio Adami (born 1935), Italian painter
 Valerio Agnoli (born 1985), Italian cyclist
 Valerio Anastasi (born 1990), Italian footballer
 Valerio Arri (1892–1970), Italian athlete 
 Valerio Aspromonte (born 1987), Italian fencer
 Valerio Bacigalupo (1924–1949), Italian footballer
 Valerio Baldassari (c.1650–1695), Italian painter
 Valerio Belli (c.1468–1546), Italian engraver
 Valerio Bernabò (born 1984), Italian rugby player
 Valerio Bertotto (born 1973), Italian footballer
 Valerio Bianchini (born 1943), Italian basketball coach
 Valerio Cassani (1922–1995), Italian footballer
 Valerio Checchi (born 1980), Italian skier
 Valerio Cioli (1529–1599), Italian sculptor
 Valerio Cleri (born 1981), Italian swimmer
 Valerio Conti (born 1993), Italian cyclist
 Valerio Corte (1530–1580), Italian painter and alchemist
 Valerio de los Santos (born 1972), Dominican baseball player
 Valerio Di Cesare (born 1983), Italian footballer
 Valerio Evangelisti (1952–2022), Italian writer
 Valerio Festi, Italian artistic director and producer
 Valerio Fiori (born 1969), Italian footballer
 Valerio Lualdi (born 1951), Italian cyclist
 Valerio Leccardi (born 1984), Swiss skier
 Valerio Magrelli (born 1957), Italian poet
 Valerio Massimo Manfredi (born 1943), Italian historian, journalist, and archaeologist
 Valerio Mastandrea (born 1972), Italian actor
 Valerio Nava (born 1994), Italian footballer
 Valerio Nawatu (born 1984), Fiji international footballer
 Valerio Olgiati (born 1958), Swiss architect
 Valerio Piva (1958), Italian cyclist
 Valerio Profondavalle (1533 – c. 1600), Flemish painter
 Valerio Rosseti (born 1994), Italian footballer
 Valerio Tebaldi (born 1965), Italian cyclist
 Valerio Varesi, Italian crime novelist
 Valerio Vermiglio (born 1976), Italian volleyball player
 Valerio Verre (born 1994), Italian footballer
 Valerio Virga (born 1986), Italian footballer
 Valerio Zanone (born 1936), Italian politician
 Valerio Zurlini (1926–1982), Italian director and screenwriter

Valerio as a surname

 Alberto Valerio (born 1985), Brazilian racing driver
 Alessandro Valerio (1881-1955), Italian horse rider
 Edvaldo Valério (born 1978), Brazilian swimmer
 Gabriel Valerio, Italian drummer for Theatres des Vampires
 Joaquín Enrique Valerio (born 1973), Spanish footballer
 Joe Valerio (born 1969), American football player
 Luca Valerio (1552–1618), Italian mathematician
 Marcos Valério (born 1961), Brazilian convicted criminal
 Matt Valerio, American hip hop producer
 Melanie Valerio (born 1969), American Olympic swimmer
 Pompilio Cacho Valerio (born 1976), Honduran footballer
 Raúl Valerio (1927-2017), Mexican actor
 Renz Valerio (born 1998), Filipino actor and model
 Samuel Valerio, Greek physician and author
 Magdalena Valerio (born 1959), Spanish congresswoman and former minister of labour, migration and social security

References

See also 

 Valeriote (surname)

Italian masculine given names
Surnames